The Westin Paris – Vendôme is a historic hotel in Paris, France at 3 rue de Castiglione on the corner of the rue de Rivoli, facing the Tuileries Garden.

History
The hotel opened on June 6th, 1878 as the Hôtel Continental, It was designed by Charles Garnier's son-in-law Henri Blondel and was intended to be the most luxurious hotel in Paris at the time. It occupied a full block, the former premises of the Ministry of Finance, (burned in 1871) which had been designed by François-Hippolyte Destailleur in 1817, following the Bourbon Restoration. During the first World War the hotel was used as a military hospital by the French. The Hôtel Continental remained the largest hotel in Paris for decades; the Russian Grand Dukes habitually stayed there; at the Liberation of Paris, bedsheets were hung from its windows as cheerful flags of surrender. The hotel was renamed the Inter-Continental Paris in 1969, and then became The Westin Paris in 2005, adding the suffix Vendôme to its name in 2010. The hotel was sold by Singapore-based sovereign wealth fund GIC to London-based Henderson Park Capital in 2017 for €550 million. The new owners announced that the hotel would be renovated at a cost of $350 million by designer Tristan Auer and would become part of Jumeirah Hotels & Resorts in 2022. The renovation and reflagging did not happen and instead, Henderson Park put the hotel up for sale in February 2022, for €800 million. In November 2022, the hotel was sold to Dubai Holding, the personal investment portfolio of Dubai ruler Sheikh Mohammed bin Rashid Al Maktoum. It was announced that the hotel would be reflagged as a Jumeirah property, as previously planned in 2017.

Notes

External links

The Westin Paris - Vendôme Official Website

Hotels in Paris
Buildings and structures in the 1st arrondissement of Paris
Hotels established in 1878
1878 establishments in France